The sponge sculpin (Thyriscus anoplus) is a species of marine ray-finned fish belonging to the family Cottidae, the typical sculpins. It is the only species in the monospecific genus Thyriscus.

The sponge sculpin was first formally described in 1912 by the American ichthyologists Charles Henry Gilbert and Charles Victor Burke with its type locality given as off Attu Island in the Bering Sea. Gilbert and Burke classified this species in the monospecific genus Thyriscus. The 5th edition of Fishes of the World classifies this genus in the subfamily Cottinae of the family Cottidae but other authorities classify it in the subfamily Psychrolutinae of the family Psychrolutidae.

References

Cottinae
Monotypic fish genera
Fish described in 1912